Tamil Rockers was a torrent website based in India which facilitates the illegal distribution of copyrighted material, including television shows, movies, music and videos. The site allows visitors to search for and download copyrighted material with the help of magnet links and torrent files, which facilitate peer-to-peer file sharing. It also operates multiple Telegram channels and groups with thousands of subscribers. Tamil Rockers is the tenth most popular torrent site in TorrentFreak's Top 10 Most Popular Torrent Sites of 2020 list.

In India, ISPs have been ordered to block access to the website. The website continues operation by switching to a series of new web addresses. Aside from its traditional list of pirate sites, apps, and hosting providers, the movie industry group Motion Picture Association (MPA) lists Tamil Rockers as one of the notorious markets.

History 
Tamil Rockers was a bootleg recording network which was founded in 2011 and later became a public torrent website that links to pirated copies of Indian films, particularly Tamil, in addition to Hollywood films dubbed into Indian languages along with the original English audio.

On March 14, 2018, three men said to be behind the site were arrested. One of the men was believed to be the site administrator. On 23 May 2019, more members of Tamil Rockers were arrested in Coimbatore.

On October 19, 2020, the site went offline but came back online after a while; it was speculated that Amazon intervened by issuing several DMCA takedown notices.

Legacy

Unofficial clones 
Since the official Tamil Rockers went offline, there has been two prominent clone websites called TamilMV and Tamil Blasters, which are also been targeted by ISPs to block them. In May, 2022, Disney Star, a subsidiary of The Walt Disney Company, filed complaint with police in India, targeting Tamil Rockers, TamilMV, and Tamil Blasters.

In popular culture 
The Tamil Rockers name has made cameo in many Tamil movies, including a Tamil movie named after the website starring Premgi Amaren released on December 31, 2021.

On July 2, 2022, SonyLIV released a web series named Tamil Rockerz, which is about online piracy and cybercrime, it stars Arun Vijay and Vani Bhojan, directed by Arivazhagan.

References 

BitTorrent websites
Notorious markets
Indian websites
Indian entertainment websites
Indian film websites
Tamil cinema
Internet properties established in 2011
2011 establishments in India
Internet censorship in India
Copyright infringement
Indian intellectual property law